2nd Alexandrovka (2-se Aleksandrovka) is a rural locality (a village) in Ilyino-Polyansky Selsoviet of Blagoveshchensky District, Russia. The population was 13 as of 2010.

Geography 
2nd Alexandrovka is located 35 km northeast of Blagoveshchensk (the district's administrative centre) by road.

Streets 
 Alexandrovskaya

References

External links 
 Council of Municipalities of the Republic of Bashkortostan

Rural localities in Blagoveshchensky District